Bolbitis quoyana is a species of fern. Indigenous to Australia, Malesia, and some Pacific islands such as Samoa and Fiji. Found in tropical rainforests, often beside streams, up to 500 metres above sea level.

References 

quoyana
Ferns of Asia
Flora of Samoa
Flora of Papua New Guinea
Flora of Fiji
Flora of Malesia
Flora of Queensland
Flora of the Northern Territory